The Central District of Kahnuj County is a district (bakhsh) in Kahnuj County, Kerman Province, Iran. At the 2006 census, its population was 70,664, in 15,029 families.  The district has one city: Kahnuj.  The district has two rural districts (dehestan): Kutak Rural District and Nakhlestan Rural District. Prior to 2011, when Kutak Rural District was formed, Howmeh Rural District was the second rural district of the Central District.

References 

Kahnuj County
Districts of Kerman Province